is a Japanese politician and former governor of Kagoshima Prefecture in Japan. A native of Izumi, Kagoshima and graduate of the University of Tokyo with the Bachelor of Laws in June 1971, he had worked at the Ministry of Home Affairs since 1972 before elected governor.

He served three terms as governor from 2004 until 2016. In July 2016 he sought a fourth term but was defeated by Satoshi Mitazono.

References 

1947 births
Living people
Politicians from Kagoshima Prefecture
University of Tokyo alumni
Governors of Kagoshima Prefecture